The 2022 Women's EuroHockey Junior Championship II was the 12th edition of the Women's EuroHockey Junior Championship II, the second level of the women's European under-21 field hockey championships organized by the European Hockey Federation. It was held in Vienna, Austria from 24 to 30 July 2022.

Qualified teams
Participating nations qualified based on their final ranking from the 2019 competition.

Results

Standings

Matches

See also
2022 Men's EuroHockey Junior Championship II
2022 Women's EuroHockey Junior Championship
2022 Women's EuroHockey Junior Championship III

Notes

References

Women's EuroHockey Junior Championship II
Junior 2
EuroHockey Junior Championship II
EuroHockey Junior Championship II
International women's field hockey competitions hosted by Austria
EuroHockey Junior Championship II
2020s in Vienna
Sports competitions in Vienna
EuroHockey Championship II